Sumner Arthur Long (31 March 1921 – 6 January 1993) was an American playwright, screenwriter, and author.

He wrote the comedy play Never Too Late.  A film adaptation was released in 1965.

Long began writing for television in 1951, and wrote many episodes of Lassie, “Father Knows Best,” “The Danny Thomas Show,” “Dobie Gillis,” and “The Donna Reed Show.”

References

External links 
 Obituary
 Biography
 Sumner Arthur Long papers, 1950-1989, held by the Billy Rose Theatre Division, New York Public Library for the Performing Arts

1921 births
1993 deaths
American dramatists and playwrights
People from Boston
Death in California